The 2012 Samarkand Challenger was a professional tennis tournament played on clay courts. It was the 16th edition of the tournament which was part of the 2012 ATP Challenger Tour. It took place in Samarkand, Uzbekistan between 6 and 12 August 2012.

Singles main draw entrants

Seeds

 1 Rankings are as of August 1, 2012.

Other entrants
The following players received wildcards into the singles main draw:
  Sarvar Ikramov
  Temur Ismailov 
  Sergey Shipilov
  Vaja Uzakov

The following players received entry from the qualifying draw:
  N.Sriram Balaji
  Jaan-Frederik Brunken
  Adrian Sikora
  Dzmitry Zhyrmont

Champions

Singles

 Dušan Lajović def.  Farrukh Dustov, 6–3, 6–2

Doubles

 Oleksandr Nedovyesov /  Ivan Sergeyev def.  Divij Sharan /  Vishnu Vardhan, 6–4, 7–6(7–1)

External links
Official Website
ITF Search
ATP official site

Samarkand Challenger
Samarkand Challenger
2012 in Uzbekistani sport
August 2012 sports events in Asia